Paris is a 1991 album recorded by French artist Marc Lavoine. It was his fourth studio album and his fifth album overall. It provided three singles which achieved moderate success on the French Singles Chart : "Paris" (#28), "L'Amour de 30 secondes" (#32) and "Ça m'est égal" (#41). The album earned a Gold certification awarded by the SNEP and was ranked on the chart for eight weeks, peaking at #35 in its third and fifth weeks.

Track listings
 "L'amour de 30 secondes" (Marc Lavoine / Fabrice Aboulker) — 3:40
 "Ça m'est égal" (Marc Lavoine / Fabrice Aboulker) — 5:00
 "Étagère" (Marc Lavoine / Fabrice Aboulker) — 2:58
 "Laisse pousser les fleurs" (Marc Lavoine / Fabrice Aboulker) — 4:18
 "Femme seule" (Marc Lavoine / Fabrice Aboulker) — 5:30
 "Paris" (Marc Lavoine / Fabrice Aboulker) — 3:50
 "Fils de moi" (Marc Lavoine / Fabrice Aboulker) — 4:01
 "Tu ne peux pas savoir" (Marc Lavoine / Fabrice Aboulker) — 4:25
 "Amour après guerre" (Pierre Grillet, Marc Lavoine / Fabrice Aboulker) — 4:15
 "Madame sans gêne" (Marc Lavoine / Fabrice Aboulker) — 3:56

Album credits

Production
Produced by Fabrice Aboulker & Jean-Philippe Bonichon
Engineered & mixed by Jean-Philippe Bonichon

Design
Raymond Depardon - photography
Bill Butt - design
Paul Ritter - design

Releases

Certifications

Charts

References

1991 albums
Marc Lavoine albums